Valchan may refer to:

 , a village in Smolyan municipality, Bulgaria
Valchan Peak, sharp rocky peak in Ellsworth Mountains, Antarctica
Valchan Chanev (born 1992), Bulgarian footballer

See also
Valchanka, village in Kirkovo Municipality, Kardzhali Province, southern Bulgaria
Valchanovo, village in Sredets Municipality, in Burgas Province, in southeastern Bulgaria
Magdalina Valchanova, Bulgarian model, beauty pageant